Shivamara II was the son of Sripurusha and ruled the Western Ganga Dynasty from 788 – 816 C.E. He was also a noted scholar in Kannada, Sanskrit and Prakrit. He succeeded to the Ganga throne during a time when the Rashtrakuta were the empire on the rise in South India and the Deccan.

Conflict with Rashtrakuta
The Rashtrakuta monarch Dhruva Dharavarsha defeated Shivamara in Mudagunduru and took the Ganga king captive. The Rashtrakuta then took direct control of the Gangavadi with the appointment of Kambharasa, son of Dhruva Dharavarsha as its governor. He was later released, only to be imprisoned again during the rule of Govinda III when he refused to pay the Rashtrakuta tribute. Shivamara II again was released only to defy the Rashtrakuta yoke by waging wars. He died fighting them in 816. Manne near Bangalore was one of his capitals during this time.

In spite of being imprisoned on multiple occasions and being at constant war, he found the time to write literary works, including Gajashtaka in Kannada, Gajamathakalpana in Sanskrit and Sethubandha in Prakrit.

According to historian Kamath, he is considered to be one of the famous kings of the Western Ganga Dynasty.

References

 Suryanath U. Kamat, Concise History of Karnataka, 2001, MCC, Bangalore (Reprint 2002)

External links
 History of Karnataka by Dr.Arthikaje
 History of Ganga Dynasty - Dr. Jyotsna Kamat

816 deaths
8th-century Indian monarchs
9th-century Indian monarchs
People of the Western Ganga dynasty
Kannada-language writers
Year of birth unknown
8th-century Indian writers
9th-century Indian writers